The men's team competition at the 2013 European Judo Championships was held on 28 April at the László Papp Budapest Sports Arena in Budapest, Hungary.

Results

Repechage

References

External links
 

Mteam
EU 2013
European Men's Team Judo Championships